Bodzanówek  is a village in the administrative district of Gmina Choceń, within Włocławek County, Kuyavian-Pomeranian Voivodeship, in north-central Poland. Its current population is around 50.

The main landmarks to be found in Bodzanówek are a series of wind turbines, and a distribution center used to export blueberries from the region by local company OWB.

References

Villages in Włocławek County